Raimonds Vilkoits (born 10 April 1990) is Latvian professional ice-hockey player, who currently plays for HK Metalurgs Liepaja of the Belarusian Extraleague.

During 2010–11 Vilkoits also played three games for Dinamo Riga of the Kontinental Hockey League.

Career statistics

References

1990 births
Dinamo Riga players
HK Liepājas Metalurgs players
HK Riga 2000 players
HK Riga players
IF Troja/Ljungby players
Living people
Latvian ice hockey centres
Ice hockey people from Riga